Monte Moro is a mountain of the Pennine Alps, located on the Swiss-Italian border. It lies west of the Monte Moro Pass.

References

External links
 Monte Moro on Hikr

Mountains of the Alps
Mountains of Switzerland
Mountains of Piedmont
Italy–Switzerland border
International mountains of Europe
Mountains of Valais
Two-thousanders of Switzerland